Ravenous is Wolf's fifth studio album produced by Roy Z. It was the debut Wolf album appearance for both bassist Anders Modd and drummer Richard Holmgren.

Track listing
 "Speed On" (Stålvind / Axeman) - 3:46
 "Curse You Salem" (Stålvind / Axeman) - 3:52
 "Voodoo" (Stålvind) - 4:17
 "Hail Caesar" (Stålvind / Axeman) - 3:48
 "Ravenous" (Stålvind / Axeman) - 3:57
 "Mr Twisted" (Stålvind / Axeman) - 3:53
 "Love At First Bite" (Stålvind / Roy Z) - 3:48
 "Secrets We Keep" (Stålvind / Modd) - 4:50
 "Whisky Psycho Hellions" (Stålvind) - 4:41
 "Hiding In Shadows" (Stålvind / Modd) - 4:18
 "Blood Angel" (Stålvind / Axeman) - 6:25
 "6 Steps" (Japan bonus track) - 4:53

Reception

Personnel

Band line-up
 Niklas Stålvind        -     Guitar & lead vocals
 Johannes "Axeman" Losbäck -  Guitar & backing vocals
 Anders Modd             -    Bass guitar
 Richard Holmgren        -    Drums

Other
 Roy Z - Producer, Mixing, Acoustic Guitar on "Blood Angel"
 Peter in de Betou - Mastering
 Hank Shermann - First guitar solo on "Ravenous"
 Mark Boals - Backing vocals on "Love At First Bite"
 Thomas Holm - Cover painting

References

External links
 Wolf's Homepage

2009 albums
Wolf (band) albums